The Ontario Blues rugby union team play in the Canadian Rugby Championship, which they won six times between 2011 and 2018.

2009 season

2010 season

2011 season

2012 season

2013 season

2014 season

2015 season 
CRC Schedule:

2016 season 

**With the win over the BC Bears on July 24, Ontario won their 5th MacTier Cup

2017 season 
Sat April 29-Ontario Blues @ New York Old Blue, Randalls Island NYC, KO TBD

Sat May 20-Glendale Raptors @ Blues, Sherwood Forest Park, Burlington, Kickoff: 3 pm

Sat June 24-Eastern Ontario @ Blues A, Oakville, KO TBD

Fri June 30-Rock A @ Blues A, Lindsay ON, 7 pm

Mon July 3-Rock @ Blues, Peterborough ON, 1 pm

Sat July 22-Blues @ Rock, Truro NS, 5 pm (League Game 1)

Sun Aug 13-Blues @ Wolfpack, Calgary, 530 pm (League Game 2)

Wed Aug 16-Blues v BC Bears, Calgary, 6 pm (League Game 3)

Sat Aug 19-Blues v TBD, Calgary, MacTier Cup finals Day (League Game 4)

References

Rugby union in Ontario